The 1998–99 Philadelphia Flyers season was the Philadelphia Flyers' 32nd season in the National Hockey League (NHL). The Flyers lost in the first round to the Toronto Maple Leafs in six games.

Off-season
In the off-season, the Flyers went looking for a new goaltender. They opted not to re-sign Sean Burke, and Ron Hextall was about to enter his final season as a backup. They chose to sign former Florida Panther John Vanbiesbrouck over former Edmonton Oilers goalie Curtis Joseph, who ended up signing with the Toronto Maple Leafs.

Regular season
Looking to put the previous year's disappointment behind them, the Flyers began the season 4–0–1. However, a quick 1–6–3 downturn caused the first casualties – as Trent Klatt was dealt to Vancouver and Shjon Podein was shipped to Colorado for Keith Jones. Jones scored a goal in his first game in orange and black, a 6–1 rout of New Jersey, keying a 6–1–0 run.

Turmoil continued, as, after a 5–4 overtime loss to the Devils on December 10 saw the Flyers blow a 4–1 lead, the decision was made to end the Chris Gratton experiment. He was dealt back to Tampa Bay along with Mike Sillinger for Mikael Renberg and Daymond Langkow, and the move paid immediate dividends. Philly topped Toronto, 3–0, spurring a 15-game unbeaten streak (10–0–5) during which the club matched a record by shutting out their opponents in four consecutive games (Islanders, Carolina, Nashville, Washington).

Another run, this time a 6–0–2 streak from January 18 to February 6, tied the Flyers atop the NHL standings with the Dallas Stars. That momentum did not last long, as the club went 1–4–1 after the All-Star break, including an inexplicable 4–3 loss in Los Angeles where the Kings scored three goals in the final minutes, including a 60-foot game-winner by Jozef Stumpel just before the final buzzer.

Following a win over Pittsburgh, the team suffered through a then franchise-worst 12 games without a victory (0–8–4), broken up only by a rally from two goals down to Detroit on March 21. Eric Lindros, who was having an MVP-type season with 40 goals and 53 assists in 71 games, was felled and lost for the season by a collapsed lung sustained during a 2–1 win against the expansion Nashville Predators on April 1. It is said that if roommate Keith Jones had not intervened at the last minute, Lindros might have died on the plane ride back to Philadelphia.

The Flyers managed to lock up the five-seed on the final day of the season with a win over Boston.

John LeClair continued his goal-scoring streak with 43 on the year, matching Tim Kerr's team record of four straight seasons with 40 or more goals.  He was one of only a handful of players to make it through the entire season, as general manager Bob Clarke made 12 trades involving NHL players throughout the regular season, including re-acquiring former Flyer Mark Recchi from the Montreal Canadiens at the trade deadline.

Season standings

Playoffs
Although Vanbiesbrouck allowed nine goals to Curtis Joseph's eleven allowed, the Flyers lost their first round series with Toronto in six games.

Schedule and results

Preseason

|- style="background:#cfc;"
| 1 || September 19 || @ Washington Capitals || 6–3 || 1–0–0 ||
|- style="background:#ffc;"
| 2 || September 22 || Pittsburgh Penguins || 2–2 || 1–0–1 ||
|- style="background:#cfc;"
| 3 || September 23 || @ Montreal Canadiens || 7–1 || 2–0–1 ||
|- style="background:#fcf;"
| 4 || September 26 || Pittsburgh Penguins || 0–1 || 2–1–1 ||
|- style="background:#cfc;"
| 5 || September 29 || Washington Capitals || 5–1 || 3–1–1 ||
|- style="background:#cfc;"
| 6 || October 1 || @ Detroit Red Wings || 4–2 || 4–1–1 ||
|- style="background:#fcf;"
| 7 || October 2 || @ New Jersey Devils || 1–2 || 4–2–1 ||
|- style="background:#cfc;"
| 8 || October 3 || Detroit Red Wings || 3–2 || 5–2–1 ||
|- style="background:#cfc;"
| 9 || October 4 || New Jersey Devils || 5–3 || 6–2–1 ||
|-
| colspan="6" style="text-align:center;"|
Notes:
 Game played at Hersheypark Arena in Hershey, Pennsylvania.
|-

|-
| Legend:

Regular season

|- style="background:#cfc;"
| 1 || October 9 || @ New York Rangers || 1–0 || 1–0–0 || 2 || 
|- style="background:#cfc;"
| 2 || October 11 || Mighty Ducks of Anaheim || 4–1 || 2–0–0 || 4 || 
|- style="background:#cfc;"
| 3 || October 16 || @ Tampa Bay Lightning || 5–2 || 3–0–0 || 6 || 
|- style="background:#ffc;"
| 4 || October 17 || @ Carolina Hurricanes || 1–1 OT || 3–0–1 || 7 || 
|- style="background:#cfc;"
| 5 || October 20 || San Jose Sharks || 3–1 || 4–0–1 || 9 || 
|- style="background:#fcf;"
| 6 || October 22 || New Jersey Devils || 2–3 || 4–1–1 || 9 || 
|- style="background:#ffc;"
| 7 || October 24 || New York Rangers || 2–2 OT || 4–1–2 || 10 || 
|- style="background:#cfc;"
| 8 || October 27 || St. Louis Blues || 2–1 || 5–1–2 || 12 || 
|- style="background:#fcf;"
| 9 || October 29 || @ Ottawa Senators || 1–3 || 5–2–2 || 12 || 
|- style="background:#fcf;"
| 10 || October 31 || @ New York Islanders || 2–3 || 5–3–2 || 12 || 
|-

|- style="background:#fcf;"
| 11 || November 1 || Ottawa Senators || 4–5 || 5–4–2 || 12 || 
|- style="background:#ffc;"
| 12 || November 3 || @ Pittsburgh Penguins || 4–4 OT || 5–4–3 || 13 || 
|- style="background:#ffc;"
| 13 || November 7 || Buffalo Sabres || 2–2 OT || 5–4–4 || 14 || 
|- style="background:#fcf;"
| 14 || November 9 || @ Montreal Canadiens || 1–5 || 5–5–4 || 14 || 
|- style="background:#fcf;"
| 15 || November 12 || Florida Panthers || 1–2 || 5–6–4 || 14 || 
|- style="background:#cfc;"
| 16 || November 14 || New Jersey Devils || 6–1 || 6–6–4 || 16 || 
|- style="background:#cfc;"
| 17 || November 17 || @ Pittsburgh Penguins || 4–1 || 7–6–4 || 18 || 
|- style="background:#cfc;"
| 18 || November 20 || @ Carolina Hurricanes || 3–1 || 8–6–4 || 20 || 
|- style="background:#cfc;"
| 19 || November 22 || @ Florida Panthers || 2–1 OT || 9–6–4 || 22 || 
|- style="background:#fcf;"
| 20 || November 25 || @ New York Islanders || 2–4 || 9–7–4 || 22 || 
|- style="background:#cfc;"
| 21 || November 27 || Toronto Maple Leafs || 4–3 || 10–7–4 || 24 || 
|- style="background:#cfc;"
| 22 || November 29 || Vancouver Canucks || 6–2 || 11–7–4 || 26 || 
|-

|- style="background:#fcf;"
| 23 || December 4 || @ Buffalo Sabres || 0–3 || 11–8–4 || 26 || 
|- style="background:#cfc;"
| 24 || December 5 || Washington Capitals || 2–1 || 12–8–4 || 28 || 
|- style="background:#ffc;"
| 25 || December 8 || @ New Jersey Devils || 5–5 OT || 12–8–5 || 29 || 
|- style="background:#fcf;"
| 26 || December 10 || New Jersey Devils || 4–5 OT || 12–9–5 || 29 || 
|- style="background:#cfc;"
| 27 || December 12 || @ Toronto Maple Leafs || 3–0 || 13–9–5 || 31 || 
|- style="background:#ffc;"
| 28 || December 13 || Edmonton Oilers || 2–2 OT || 13–9–6 || 32 || 
|- style="background:#ffc;"
| 29 || December 17 || Calgary Flames || 3–3 OT || 13–9–7 || 33 || 
|- style="background:#cfc;"
| 30 || December 19 || Chicago Blackhawks || 3–1 || 14–9–7 || 35 || 
|- style="background:#ffc;"
| 31 || December 20 || Tampa Bay Lightning || 2–2 OT || 14–9–8 || 36 || 
|- style="background:#cfc;"
| 32 || December 23 || @ Boston Bruins || 2–1 || 15–9–8 || 38 || 
|- style="background:#cfc;"
| 33 || December 26 || @ Chicago Blackhawks || 3–2 || 16–9–8 || 40 || 
|- style="background:#ffc;"
| 34 || December 28 || @ San Jose Sharks || 1–1 OT || 16–9–9 || 41 || 
|- style="background:#cfc;"
| 35 || December 29 || @ Calgary Flames || 4–3 OT || 17–9–9 || 43 || 
|- style="background:#cfc;"
| 36 || December 31 || @ Vancouver Canucks || 6–2 || 18–9–9 || 45 || 
|-

|- style="background:#ffc;"
| 37 || January 3 || @ Edmonton Oilers || 3–3 OT || 18–9–10 || 46 || 
|- style="background:#cfc;"
| 38 || January 7 || New York Islanders || 5–0 || 19–9–10 || 48 || 
|- style="background:#cfc;"
| 39 || January 9 || Carolina Hurricanes || 2–0 || 20–9–10 || 50 || 
|- style="background:#cfc;"
| 40 || January 11 || Nashville Predators || 8–0 || 21–9–10 || 52 || 
|- style="background:#cfc;"
| 41 || January 13 || @ Washington Capitals || 3–0 || 22–9–10 || 54 || 
|- style="background:#fcf;"
| 42 || January 16 || Toronto Maple Leafs || 3–4 || 22–10–10 || 56 || 
|- style="background:#cfc;"
| 43 || January 18 || @ Ottawa Senators || 5–0 || 23–10–10 || 56 || 
|- style="background:#cfc;"
| 44 || January 21 || Washington Capitals || 4–1 || 24–10–10 || 58 || 
|- style="background:#ffc;"
| 45 || January 26 || Florida Panthers || 3–3 OT || 24–10–11 || 59 || 
|- style="background:#cfc;"
| 46 || January 28 || Phoenix Coyotes || 4–2 || 25–10–11 || 61 || 
|- style="background:#cfc;"
| 47 || January 30 || Tampa Bay Lightning || 6–2 || 26–10–11 || 63 || 
|-

|- style="background:#cfc;"
| 48 || February 1 || Los Angeles Kings || 4–2 || 27–10–11 || 65 || 
|- style="background:#cfc;"
| 49 || February 4 || Montreal Canadiens || 5–2 || 28–10–11 || 67 || 
|- style="background:#ffc;"
| 50 || February 6 || Boston Bruins || 2–2 OT || 28–10–12 || 68 || 
|- style="background:#fcf;"
| 51 || February 10 || @ Mighty Ducks of Anaheim || 4–5 || 28–11–12 || 68 || 
|- style="background:#fcf;"
| 52 || February 11 || @ Los Angeles Kings || 3–4 || 28–12–12 || 68 || 
|- style="background:#ffc;"
| 53 || February 14 || @ Colorado Avalanche || 4–4 OT || 28–12–13 || 69 || 
|- style="background:#cfc;"
| 54 || February 16 || @ Phoenix Coyotes || 4–1 || 29–12–13 || 71 || 
|- style="background:#fcf;"
| 55 || February 18 || Montreal Canadiens || 1–3 || 29–13–13 || 71 || 
|- style="background:#fcf;"
| 56 || February 20 || @ Ottawa Senators || 1–4 || 29–14–13 || 71 || 
|- style="background:#cfc;"
| 57 || February 21 || Pittsburgh Penguins || 2–1 || 30–14–13 || 73 || 
|- style="background:#fcf;"
| 58 || February 24 || @ Florida Panthers || 3–5 || 30–15–13 || 73 || 
|- style="background:#fcf;"
| 59 || February 26 || @ Tampa Bay Lightning || 1–4 || 30–16–13 || 73 || 
|- style="background:#fcf;"
| 60 || February 28 || @ New York Rangers || 5–6 || 30–17–13 || 73 || 
|-

|- style="background:#fcf;"
| 61 || March 2 || @ Montreal Canadiens || 1–4 || 30–18–13 || 73 || 
|- style="background:#fcf;"
| 62 || March 4 || Ottawa Senators || 0–5 || 30–19–13 || 73 || 
|- style="background:#ffc;"
| 63 || March 6 || New York Islanders || 3–3 OT || 30–19–14 || 74 || 
|- style="background:#ffc;"
| 64 || March 7 || @ Buffalo Sabres || 1–1 OT || 30–19–15 || 75 || 
|- style="background:#ffc;"
| 65 || March 9 || @ New York Islanders || 2–2 OT || 30–19–16 || 76 || 
|- style="background:#fcf;"
| 66 || March 11 || Colorado Avalanche || 3–5 || 30–20–16 || 76 || 
|- style="background:#fcf;"
| 67 || March 13 || @ Pittsburgh Penguins || 0–4 || 30–21–16 || 76 || 
|- style="background:#ffc;"
| 68 || March 14 || Dallas Stars || 1–1 OT || 30–21–17 || 77 || 
|- style="background:#fcf;"
| 69 || March 16 || @ St. Louis Blues || 2–5 || 30–22–17 || 77 || 
|- style="background:#cfc;"
| 70 || March 21 || Detroit Red Wings || 5–4 || 31–22–17 || 79 || 
|- style="background:#cfc;"
| 71 || March 22 || @ Toronto Maple Leafs || 3–1 || 32–22–17 || 81 || 
|- style="background:#cfc;"
| 72 || March 27 || New York Rangers || 3–1 || 33–22–17 || 83 || 
|- style="background:#fcf;"
| 73 || March 28 || @ Detroit Red Wings || 2–3 OT || 33–23–17 || 83 || 
|- style="background:#ffc;"
| 74 || March 30 || Carolina Hurricanes || 3–3 OT || 33–23–18 || 84 || 
|-

|- style="background:#cfc;"
| 75 || April 1 || @ Nashville Predators || 2–1 || 34–23–18 || 86 || 
|- style="background:#fcf;"
| 76 || April 3 || @ Boston Bruins || 0–3 || 34–24–18 || 86 || 
|- style="background:#fcf;"
| 77 || April 5 || New York Rangers || 1–5 || 34–25–18 || 86 || 
|- style="background:#cfc;"
| 78 || April 8 || Pittsburgh Penguins || 3–1 || 35–25–18 || 88 || 
|- style="background:#cfc;"
| 79 || April 10 || @ Washington Capitals || 2–1 || 36–25–18 || 90 || 
|- style="background:#ffc;"
| 80 || April 13 || Buffalo Sabres || 2–2 OT || 36–25–19 || 91 || 
|- style="background:#fcf;"
| 81 || April 16 || @ New Jersey Devils || 2–3 OT || 36–26–19 || 91 || 
|- style="background:#cfc;"
| 82 || April 18 || Boston Bruins || 3–1 || 37–26–19 || 93 || 
|-

|-
| Legend:

Playoffs

|- style="background:#cfc;"
| 1 || April 22 || @ Toronto Maple Leafs || 3–0 || Flyers lead 1–0 || 
|- style="background:#fcf;"
| 2 || April 24 || @ Toronto Maple Leafs || 1–2 || Series tied 1–1 || 
|- style="background:#fcf;"
| 3 || April 26 || Toronto Maple Leafs || 1–2 || Maple Leafs lead 2–1 || 
|- style="background:#cfc;"
| 4 || April 28 || Toronto Maple Leafs || 5–2 || Series tied 2–2 || 
|- style="background:#fcf;"
| 5 || April 30 || @ Toronto Maple Leafs || 1–2 OT || Maple Leafs lead 3–2 || 
|- style="background:#fcf;"
| 6 || May 2 || Toronto Maple Leafs || 0–1 || Maple Leafs win 4–2 || 
|-

|-
| Legend:

Player statistics

Scoring
 Position abbreviations: C = Center; D = Defense; G = Goaltender; LW = Left Wing; RW = Right Wing
  = Joined team via a transaction (e.g., trade, waivers, signing) during the season. Stats reflect time with the Flyers only.
  = Left team via a transaction (e.g., trade, waivers, release) during the season. Stats reflect time with the Flyers only.

Goaltending

Awards and records

Awards

Records

Among the team records set during the 1998–99 season was Eric Lindros tying the team record for most points during a single period (4) on November 14. Lindros replicated this feat two weeks later on November 29, also tying the team record for most assists in a period (4), while John LeClair tied team records for goals scored in a regular season game (4) and period (3). From January 7 to January 13, the Flyers tied a team record with four straight shutouts. January 7 was also the first of 18 consecutive games until February 18 that Lindros recorded at least one point, tying Bobby Clarke’s team record set during the 1974–75 season. The season finale on April 18 was the 484th and final game of Rod Brind'Amour’s franchise record consecutive games streak. The Flyers nine goals allowed is the team record for the fewest allowed during a single playoff season.

1998–99 was the final NHL season for longtime Flyers goaltender Ron Hextall, who holds several career records for the team. Serving in a backup role to starter John Vanbiesbrouck, Hextall was able to surpass Bernie Parent for games played by a goaltender (489) and wins (240) during the season. He also holds the team playoff career goalie marks for games played (84), wins (45), and minutes played (4,928). Hextall holds the NHL career records for most penalty minutes by a goaltender in the regular season (569) and playoffs (115), and is one of only two goalies to score a goal during a Stanley Cup playoffs game.

Transactions
The Flyers were involved in the following transactions from June 17, 1998, the day after the deciding game of the 1998 Stanley Cup Finals, through June 19, 1999, the day of the deciding game of the 1999 Stanley Cup Finals.

Trades

Players acquired

Players lost

Signings

Draft picks

Philadelphia's picks at the 1998 NHL Entry Draft, which was held at the Marine Midland Arena in Buffalo, New York, on June 27, 1998. The Flyers traded their third-round pick, 81st overall, to the Vancouver Canucks for Dave Babych and the Flyers' fifth-round pick, 139th overall, on March 24, 1998.

Farm teams
The Flyers were affiliated with the Philadelphia Phantoms of the AHL.

Notes

References
General
 
 
 
 
Specific

1998–99 NHL season by team
1998–99 in American ice hockey by team
1998
Philadelphia
Philadelphia